Cyclodium is a plant genus in the fern family Dryopteridaceae, subfamily Polybotryoideae, in the Pteridophyte Phylogeny Group classification of 2016 (PPG I).

Species
, the Checklist of Ferns and Lycophytes of the World accepted the following species:
Cyclodium akawaiorum A.R.Sm.
Cyclodium calophyllum (C.V.Morton) A.R.Sm.
Cyclodium guianense (Klotzsch) van der Werff ex L.D.Gómez
Cyclodium heterodon (Schrad.) T.Moore
Cyclodium inerme (Fée) A.R.Sm.
Cyclodium meniscioides (Willd.) C.Presl
Cyclodium rheophilum A.R.Sm.
Cyclodium seemannii (Hook.) A.R.Sm.
Cyclodium trianae (Mett.) A.R.Sm.
Cyclodium varians (Fée) A.R.Sm.

References

Dryopteridaceae
Fern genera
Taxa named by Carl Borivoj Presl